Arzemiro dos Prazeres (Bano) is a São Toméan politician. He was born on October 24, 1958, on the island of Príncipe. He is currently serving as Minister of Public Works, Infrastructure, and Urban Development. He served as a Minister of Industry, Commerce and Tourism twice, from 1992-1994  and from 2002-2003. He holds bachelor's degree in Marine Biology from  Universidade Federal Rural do Rio de Janeiro, where he graduated in 1985. He pursued graduate-level studies in Fisheries Technology at SUDPE Rio de Janeiro Brasil, where he graduated in 1987. He became President of the Santomean National Assembly in 2010 and succeeded Francisco da Silva, he had a position for a few months, Evaristo Carvalho took that position later on.

References

External links
www.jornaltropical.st

Living people
1958 births
Government ministers of São Tomé and Príncipe
People from Príncipe